The Kolomeytsev Islands (ostrova Kolomeytseva) is a group of two small islands, part of the Nordenskjold Archipelago in the Kara Sea coastal region, off the coast of Siberia. These two islands are located at the northwestern end of the archipelago.

Geography and history
The climate in the northernmost end of the archipelago is severe and the sea surrounding the little Kolomeytsev Islands is covered with fast ice in the winter and often obstructed by pack ice even in the summer.

These islands belong to the Krasnoyarsk Krai administrative division of Russia and is part of the Great Arctic State Nature Reserve, the largest nature reserve of Russia.

In 1900, the islands of the Nordenskiöld Archipelago were explored by Russian geologist Baron Eduard Von Toll during the Polar Expedition on behalf of the Imperial Russian Academy of Sciences aboard ship Zarya. The islands were named after Captain Nikolai Kolomeitsev, first commander of the ship. (Albert Hastings Markham. Arctic Exploration, 1895)

References

External links
Early Soviet Exploration

Islands of the Nordenskiöld Archipelago
Islands of Krasnoyarsk Krai